Attorney General Hansen may refer to:

Phil L. Hansen (1923–1992), Attorney General of Utah from 1965 to 1969
Robert B. Hansen (1925–2005), Attorney General of Utah from 1977 to 1981

See also
Richard Hanson (Australian politician) (1805–1876), Attorney-General of South Australia